Kris Williams may refer to:

Kris Williams, investigator and researcher on Syfy's Ghost Hunters International
Kris Swanberg (born 1980), an American filmmaker who has also been credited as Kris Williams

See also
Christopher Williams (disambiguation)
Chris Williams (disambiguation)